I Never Knew That About Britain is a British factual show that aired on ITV from 3 March to 21 April 2014 and was hosted by Paul Martin with reporters Suzannah Lipscomb and Steve Mould.

2014 British television series debuts
2014 British television series endings
ITV (TV network) original programming
Television series by ITV Studios